River East Transcona School Division (RETSD) is a school division located in Winnipeg, Manitoba. As the second largest school division in the province, it is composed of parts of what used to be two separate divisions that merged in 2002: the urban section (i.e., Transcona) of the Transcona-Springfield School Division; and the River East School Division.

RETSD provides educational services to approximately 16,700 students in 42 schools, as well as operating the McLeod Education Centre for adult learning. The division employs approximately 1,200 teachers and 650 support staff, and offers English and French-immersion programming, as well as English-German bilingual and Ukrainian bilingual.

Schools and students
, RETSD has a total of 16,716 students, including: 7,538 in kindergarten to fifth grade; 3,804 in grades 6 to 8; and 5,374 in grades 9 to 12.

RETSD is composed of 42 schools—36 elementary & middle schools and 6 high schools—and 2 learning centres. Schools in River East Transcona are listed below.

Early years 

 Angus McKay School
 Bertrun E. Glavin School
 Bird's Hill School
 Donwood School
 Dr. F.W.L. Hamilton School
 École Centrale
 École Margaret-Underhill
 École Neil Campbell School
 École Springfield Heights School
 École Sun Valley School
 Emerson School
 Hampstead School
 Harold Hatcher School
 John de Graff School
 Joseph Teres School
 Lord Wolseley School
 Maple Leaf School
 Polson School
 Prince Edward School
 Princess Margaret School
 Radisson School
 Sherwood School
 Wayoata School
 Westview School

Middle school and mixed 
Early/middle years:

 Bernie Wolfe School 
 École Salisbury Morse Place School
 John Pritchard School

Middle schools:

 Arthur Day Middle School
 Chief Peguis Middle School
 École John Henderson Middle School
 École Munroe Middle School
 École Regent Park
 John W. Gunn Middle School
 Robert Andrews Middle School
 Valley Gardens Middle School

High schools 
 Collège Miles Macdonell Collegiate
 Collège Pierre-Elliott-Trudeau
 John G. Stewart School
 Kildonan-East Collegiate
 Murdoch MacKay Collegiate
 River East Collegiate
 Transcona Collegiate Institute

See also
 List of school districts in Manitoba
 Manitoba School Boards Association

References

External links
River East Transcona School Division
RETSD International Education Program
RETSD Adult & Continuing Education
Manitoba Education

Transcona, Winnipeg
School divisions in Winnipeg